Solana is a cottage manufacturer of sports, racing, and kids' automobiles. The family run company has operated since 1936, with a total production of fewer than fifty cars; the majority of them one-offs. The family is heavily involved in motor sports; the most prominent member was Moisés Solana, who raced family-built cars and later in Formula One.

History 
Operating since 1936, the company had built a total of forty-two cars until 2003. Many of the early cars were actually meant for children, using small single-cylinder engines. Others were single-seater racing specials. The Deportivo Series II has been available since 1998, after having first been shown at a concours in Huixquilucan (Dos Ríos), in May 1996. This car, built on a tubular space frame, utilizes a 1.8 litre Datsun engine. It was built by Joaquín and Javier Solana and inspired by a 1954 special built by Javier for the Carrera Panamericana. The carburetted engine only has , which is supposedly enough for a  top speed.

Logo
Solana's logo is a circled "S" with a squared segment on top, containing the "Solana" name. It is colored black and gold. Some cars have a round logo with an "S" in it instead.

See also 
Cars in Mexico

References

External links

Solana Sports Cars, manufacturer website

Car manufacturers of Mexico
Manufacturing companies based in Mexico City
Sports car manufacturers
Mexican brands
Vehicle manufacturing companies established in 1936